Methylorhabdus multivorans is a Gram-negative, aerobic, facultatively methylotrophic nonmotile bacterium from the genus Methylorhabdus. Methylorhabdus multivorans has been isolated from groundwater which was contaminated with dichloromethane in Switzerland.

References

Further reading

External links
Type strain of Methylorhabdus multivorans at BacDive -  the Bacterial Diversity Metadatabase

Hyphomicrobiales
Bacteria described in 1996